Jeotgalibacillus marinus is a bacterium used as a soil inoculant in agriculture and horticulture.

References

Bacillales
Bacteria described in 2010